University Avenue may refer to:

Canada
University Avenue (Edmonton), Alberta
University Avenue (Toronto), Ontario
University Avenue (Waterloo, Ontario), local name of Waterloo Regional Road 57
University Avenue (Windsor, Ontario)

Philippines
University Avenue MRT Station, Manila

United States
University Avenue (Hammond, Louisiana), cosigned as Louisiana Highway 3234
University Avenue (Minneapolis–Saint Paul), Minnesota
University Avenue (Provo, Utah), part of U.S. Route 189
University Avenue Bridge, Philadelphia, Pennsylvania

See also
 University Square (disambiguation)
 University Street (disambiguation)
 University (disambiguation)